The 1988 United States presidential election in Alabama took place on November 8, 1988. All fifty states, and the District of Columbia, were part of the 1988 presidential election. Alabama voters chose nine electors to the Electoral College, which selected the president and vice president. Alabama was won by incumbent United States Vice President George H. W. Bush of Texas, who was running against Massachusetts Governor Michael Dukakis. Bush ran with Indiana Senator Dan Quayle as Vice President, and Dukakis ran with Texas Senator Lloyd Bentsen.

Alabama weighed in for this election as 11% more Republican than the national average. The presidential election of 1988 was a very partisan election, with more than 99 percent of the electorate voting for either the Democratic or Republican parties. The vast majority of counties in Alabama voted for Bush, with the major exception being the Black Belt, which with its predominantly African-American populace voted overwhelmingly Democratic. Macon County had been the most Democratic in the nation in 1980 and 1984, and it was Dukakis’ sixth-best county in the nation with a margin of over four-to-one for the Massachusetts Governor.

As of the 2020 election, this is the last time any presidential candidate won every congressional district in Alabama. Bush also remains the last Republican candidate to win the heavily black 7th congressional district. Bush won the election in Alabama with a victorious 20-point landslide. Alabama remained, in this election, very much a part of the Republican stronghold of the Deep South. The election results in Alabama are reflective of a nationwide political re-consolidation of the base for the Republican Party, which took place throughout the 1980s. Through the passage of some very controversial economic programs, spearheaded by then President Ronald Reagan (called, collectively, "Reaganomics"), the mid-to-late 1980s saw a period of economic growth and stability. The hallmark of Reaganomics was, in part, the wide-scale deregulation of corporate interests, and tax cuts for the wealthy.

Dukakis ran on a socially liberal platform, and advocated for higher economic regulation and environmental protection. Bush, alternatively, ran on a campaign of continuing the social and economic policies of former President Reagan – which gained him much support with conservatives and people living in rural areas. Additionally, while the economic programs passed under Reagan, and furthered under Bush and Bill Clinton, may have boosted the economy for a brief period, they are criticized by many analysts as "setting the stage" for economic troubles in the United States after 2007, such as the Great Recession.

Results

Results by county

See also
 Presidency of George H. W. Bush
 United States presidential elections in Alabama

Notes

References

Alabama
1988
1988 Alabama elections